Sir Edward Barton (c. 1562 – 28 February 1598) was an English diplomat who was Ambassador to the Ottoman Empire, appointed by Queen Elizabeth I of England.

Barton went to Constantinople in 1578, in the pay of the Levant Company, as secretary to the founder of the English embassy in the city, William Harborne and in 1588 was left by Harborne as English agent.  By this time he was fluent in Turkish and well respected in the court.

This was a time of war between England and Spain, and Barton was charged with trying to obtain the support of the Ottomans in this struggle, while of course working to defend English commercial interests by for example trying to persuade the Porte to prevent Florence from trading in cloth in Ottoman territory. Barton requested a portrait of Elizabeth I from England which he could show the Sultan and hang in his lodgings to comfort English visitors.

In 1596 Barton accompanied Sultan Mehmet III in his campaign against Hungary and was present at the siege of Eger.

During his time in the city there were difficulties with his neighbours, who were offended by the raucous behaviour of guests at Barton's parties.

On 28 February 1598, Barton died of dysentery and his body was ceremonially taken from Pera House to the island of Heybeliada for burial in the cemetery of the Christian church. The Fugger agent in Venice reported that 'the funeral of the late English envoy was carried out with great solemnity and attended by many distinguished gentlemen and representatives of foreign countries'. His grave was later removed to the British Haydarpaşa Cemetery in the district of Üsküdar.

References

For his relationship with the Patriarch of Alexandria Meletios Pigas in Constantinople (1597-1598) see the PhD Thesis of Vassiliki Tzoga, Meletios Pigas (1550-1601) Patriarch of Alexandria. Biography and Works, National and Kapodistrian University of Athens, Athens 2009.

1560s births
1598 deaths
Ambassadors of England to the Ottoman Empire
Levant Company
English knights
16th-century English diplomats